WJLZ is a Contemporary Christian, Christian Rock, and Christian Hip Hop formatted broadcast radio station licensed to Virginia Beach, Virginia, serving the Southside of Hampton Roads.  WJLZ is owned and operated by Virginia Beach Educational Broadcasting Foundation, Inc.

Translators
In addition to the main station, WJLZ is relayed by three FM translators to widen its broadcast area.

References

External links
 Current FM Online
 

1989 establishments in Virginia
Contemporary Christian radio stations in the United States
Radio stations established in 1989
JLZ
Mass media in Virginia Beach, Virginia
JLZ